Blackline Safety Corp. (formerly Blackline GPS) is Canadian public company that designs, develops and manufactures employee safety monitoring technology. It is traded under the symbol BLN on the TSX Venture Exchange.

History
The company started out as Blackline GPS. They introduced a car-tracking device that uses GPS in 2008. Named GPS Snitch, it can be controlled via the internet or by texting to a special phone number.

Another offering from Blackline is named Blip.

The idea for the initial product originated in 2004, but success was limited by the lack of a reliable income stream. Outside funding enabled growth in the consumer market, but by 2010 "the decision was made to leave the consumer GPS market and focus solely on the industrial GPS market".

In 2013 85% of the company's income was from consumer sales, but in 2018 85% was from industrial sales.

In 2014, the company received a contract of $240,000 CAD from the Canadian government under the Build in Canada Innovation Program. They worked with Correctional Services Canada in Ontario to outfit parole officers with about 100 of its Loner 900/Loner Bridge System monitors.

The company changed names in July 2015 to Blackline Safety Corp.

Income stream
The company requires monthly (or yearly) fees. Success is based on having an ongoing income stream; getting more customers is not enough.

See also
 LoJack
 OnStar

References

External links
 
 Official (GPS Snitch) product website

Technology companies of the United States